Am Ende der Sonne is the second solo album of the German musician Farin Urlaub, released in 2005. The title translates to At Sun's end.

Track listing
All songs written by Farin Urlaub.
 "Mehr" (More) – 3:14
 "Noch einmal" (Once again) is hidden in the pregap of "Mehr", hearable by rewinding to – 4:42.
 "Sonne" (Sun) – 4:40
 "Augenblick" (The moment, lit. the blink of an eye) – 3:08
 "Porzellan" (Porcelain) – 3:52
 "Unter Wasser" (Underwater) – 4:02
 "Wie ich den Marilyn-Manson-Ähnlichkeitswettbewerb verlor" (How I lost the Marilyn Manson look-alike contest) – 3:12
 "Unsichtbar" (Invisible) – 3:14
 "Apocalypse wann anders" (Apocalypse some other day) – 4:02
 "Schon wieder" (Done again) – 1:19
 "Immer noch" (Still) – 4:38
 "Alle dasselbe" (All the same) – 3:28
 "Kein Zurück" (No return) – 4:54
 "Dermitder" (Hewiththe) – 4:03
 "Dusche" (Shower) – 4:12
 On the vinyl version "Noch einmal" is a hidden track after "Dusche".

Note: Track 6 is titled "Wie ich den Farin-Urlaub-Ähnlichkeitswettbewerb gewann" (How I won the Farin Urlaub look-alike contest'') in the CD-Text.

Singles
2005: "Dusche"
2005: "Porzellan"
2005: "Sonne"

Personnel
Farin Urlaub (guitar, vocals, bass, drums)
Peter Quintern (saxophone)
R. S. Göhring (sackbut)
Hans-Jörg Fischer (saxophone)
Hardy Appich (trumpet)
Lioudmila (cello in "Dusche")
Ralf Hübner (violin in "Dusche")
Rachel Rep (drums in "Noch einmal")

Charts

Weekly charts

Year-end charts

References

2005 albums
Farin Urlaub albums